The 1985 TCU Horned Frogs football team represented Texas Christian University (TCU) in the 1985 NCAA Division I-A football season. The Horned Frogs finished the season 3–8 overall and 0–8 in the Southwest Conference. The team was coached by Jim Wacker, in his third year as head coach. The Frogs played their home games in Amon G. Carter Stadium, which is located on campus in Fort Worth, Texas.

Schedule

References

TCU
TCU Horned Frogs football seasons
TCU Horned Frogs football